The 2018 Alabama House of Representatives elections were held on November 6, 2018, as part of the biennial United States elections. All 105 of Alabama's state representatives were up for reelection. In Alabama, members of both the House of Representatives and the Senate serve four year terms, running in years corresponding with presidential midterm elections.

The Republican Party picked up five seats in the chamber, despite national success for the Democratic Party throughout the United States. Several factors contributed to this. For one, four of the gains made by Republicans were in rural districts with longtime incumbents who chose to retire in 2018 rather than run for reelection. A lack of strong incumbents allowed the Republicans, whose support among rural whites has greatly strengthened in Alabama since the 1990s, to pick up most of these seats with relative ease. Additionally, the Alabama Democratic Party was heavily disorganized and internally divided, leaving many candidates in competitive districts to run without a meaningful party apparatus behind them. President Donald Trump's popularity in the state (which he won by 28 points in 2016) likely also contributed to increased enthusiasm among Republicans. While Democrats did increase their share of the popular vote from 2014, it was more a function of several Democratic-seats being left uncontested than an increase in statewide support.

The results were a major disappointment for Democrats, who less than a year earlier had won a fiercely fought the U.S. Senate race in Alabama. As a result of these defeats the state party began a period of reform, with State Representative Christopher J. England replacing Nancy Worley as chair of the party. The results also highlighted the dramatic racial divide among Alabama's political parties—after this election, only one Democratic representative (Neil Rafferty) in the chamber was white, while no Republican representatives were black.

Close races
Seats where the margin of victory was under 10%:
  (gain)
  (gain)

Election results
Before the election, Republicans already held 72–33 supermajority over the Democrats. After the election, Republicans increased it to a margin of 77–28.

Overview

District 1

District 2

District 3

District 4

District 5

District 6

District 7

District 8

District 9

District 10

District 11

District 12

District 13

District 14

District 15

District 16

District 17

District 18

District 19

District 20

District 21

District 22

District 23

District 24

District 25

District 26

District 27

District 28

District 29

District 30

District 31

District 32

District 33

District 34

District 35

District 36

District 37

District 38

District 39

District 40

District 41

District 42

District 43

District 44

District 45

District 46

District 47

District 48

District 49

District 50

District 51

District 52

District 53

District 54

District 55

District 56

District 57

District 58

District 59

District 60

District 61

District 62

District 63

District 64

District 65

District 66

District 67

District 68

District 69

District 70

District 71

District 72

District 73

District 74

District 75

District 76

District 77

District 78

District 79

District 80

District 81

District 82

District 83

District 84

District 85

District 86

District 87

District 88

District 89

District 90

District 91

District 92

District 93

District 94

District 95

District 96

District 97

District 98

District 99

District 100

District 101

District 102

District 103

District 104

District 105

See also
2010 Alabama State House of Representatives election
2018 United States elections
2018 United States House of Representatives elections in Alabama
2018 Alabama gubernatorial election
Alabama lieutenant gubernatorial election, 2018
Alabama Attorney General election, 2018
Alabama State Treasurer election, 2018
Alabama State Auditor election, 2018
Alabama Commissioner of Agriculture and Industries election, 2018
Alabama Public Service Commission election, 2018
Alabama Secretary of State election, 2018
2018 Alabama State Senate election
2018 Alabama elections
Supreme Court of Alabama elections

References

House of Representatives
2018
Alabama House of Representatives